12848 Agostino, provisional designation , is a stony Eunomia asteroid from the central region of the asteroid belt, approximately 5 kilometers in diameter.

The asteroid was discovered on 10 July 1997, by Italian astronomer Andrea Boattini at the Campo Imperatore Observatory in the Gran Sasso massif of central Italy. It was named after the father of the discoverer, Agostino Boattini.

Orbit and classification 

Agostino is a member of the Eunomia family, a large group of stony S-type asteroids and the most prominent family in the  intermediate main-belt. It orbits the Sun  at a distance of 2.4–2.9 AU once every 4 years and 2 months (1,534 days). Its orbit has an eccentricity of 0.10 and an inclination of 15° with respect to the ecliptic.

The body's observation arc begins 47 years prior to its official discovery observation with a precovery taken at Palomar Observatory in June 1950.

Physical characteristics 

Two rotational lightcurves of Agostino were obtained in the R-band from photometric observations by astronomers at the Palomar Transient Factory in August 2010, and February 2012, respectively.

According to the NEOWISE mission of NASA's space-based Wide-field Infrared Survey Explorer, Agostino measures 4.9 kilometers in diameter and its surface has an albedo of 0.23. The Collaborative Asteroid Lightcurve Link assumes an albedo of 0.21 – derived from 15 Eunomia, the family's largest member and namesake – and calculates a diameter of 4.6 kilometers with an absolute magnitude of 14.02.

Naming 

This minor planet was named after Agostino Boattini (born 1932), the father of the discoverer. The approved naming citation was published by the Minor Planet Center on 9 May 2001.

References

External links 
 Asteroid Lightcurve Database (LCDB), query form (info )
 Dictionary of Minor Planet Names, Google books
 Asteroids and comets rotation curves, CdR – Observatoire de Genève, Raoul Behrend
 Discovery Circumstances: Numbered Minor Planets (10001)-(15000) – Minor Planet Center
 
 

012848
Discoveries by Andrea Boattini
Named minor planets
19970710